Sir Nicholas Fancourt Parkinson (5 December 1925 – 12 September 2001) was a senior Australian Public Servant. He was Secretary of the Department of Foreign Affairs between February 1977 and September 1979.

Early life
Nick Parkinson was born in England on 5 December 1925, migrating to Australia with his family when his father was appointed headmaster of King's School Parramatta.

Career
Parkinson joined the Department of External Affairs as a cadet in 1951.

Rising up the ranks, he was appointed a Deputy Secretary of the Department of Foreign Affairs in 1974. He was named Australian Ambassador to the United States in 1976. Before departing on the post, he said that it was "enormously important" to keep in touch with American thinking on the Soviet Union, the Strategic Arms Limitation Talks, China and Japan.

Parkinson returned from Washington to become the Secretary of the Department in 1977. Whilst head of the department, he suffered severe eyestrain. In 1979, he left his Secretary role to return to the United States as Australian Ambassador once again.

Awards
Parkinson was made a Knight Bachelor in 1979.

References

1925 births
2001 deaths
Australian diplomats
Australian Knights Bachelor
Australian public servants
Deaths from cancer in the Australian Capital Territory
English emigrants to Australia